Yenen is a surname. Notable people with the surname include:

Şerif Yenen (born 1963), Turkish travel specialist, tour guide, travel writer, filmmaker, keynote speaker, and lecturer
Tuba Yenen (born 1991), Turkish karateka

See also
 Yenne